Tseng Chia-min (born May 7, 1983 in Taiwan) is a former Taiwanese professional baseball player who had played for Brother Elephants of Chinese Professional Baseball League (CPBL).  His cousin, Chen Chih-yuan(陳致遠), is also former professional baseball player.

Career statistics

References

External links
 

1983 births
Living people
Baseball pitchers
Baseball players from Taoyuan City
Brother Elephants players
Fu Jen Catholic University alumni